House of Suren or Surenas (Parthian: 𐭎𐭅𐭓𐭉𐭍 Surēn, Middle Persian: 𐭮𐭥𐭫𐭩𐭭)  is one of two Parthian noble families explicitly mentioned by name in sources dateable to the Arsacid period.

History 
The head of Suren family had the privilege to crown the first Parthian king in the 3rd century BC, which founded a tradition that was continued by his descendants. Following the 3rd century AD defeat of the Arsacids and the subsequent rise of the Sassanids, the Surenas then switched sides and began to serve the Persians, at whose court they were identified as one of the so-called "Parthian clans." The last attested scion of the family was a military commander active in northern China during the 9th century.

It is probable that the Surenas were landowners in Sakastan, that is, in the region between Arachosia and Drangiana in present-day southeast Iran and Southern Afghanistan. The Surenas appear to have governed Sistan (which derives its name from 'Sakastan' and was once a much larger region than the present day province) as their personal fiefdom.

"Ernst Herzfeld maintained that the dynasty of [the Indo-Parthian emperor] Gondophares represented the House of Suren." Other notable members of the family include the 1st century BC cavalry commander Surena, Gregory the Illuminator, and Chihor-Vishnasp, a 6th-century AD governor of Armenia who attempted to establish Zoroastrianism in that country.

Mehr Narseh, the minister of four Sasanian kings, was from the House of Suren.

References

Bibliography

 
 
 
 
 .
 
 
 
 Plutarch, "Marcus Crassus", in 
 
 
 
 

 
Iranian dynasties